21 Leonis Minoris is a star in the constellation of Leo Minor. With an apparent magnitude of about 4.5, the star is faintly visible to the naked eye (see Bortle scale). It is considered a member of the Sirius supercluster.

21 Leonis Minoris rotates fairly fast for a star; its projected rotational velocity is estimated to 155 km/s so it must be rotating at least that fast. It has been listed as a fast-rotating spectral standard star for the spectral type of A7V, as opposed to the slow-rotating standard star 2 Hydrae. It is also a Delta Scuti variable, and its apparent magnitude varies from 4.47 to 4.52.

21 Leonis Minoris has an infrared excess, suggesting a debris disk around it.

References

Leo Minor
Delta Scuti variables
Leo Minoris, 21
049593
087696
3974
Durchmusterung objects
A-type main-sequence stars
Gliese and GJ objects